Charváty a municipality and village in Olomouc District in the Olomouc Region of the Czech Republic. It has about 900 inhabitants.

Administrative parts
Villages of Čertoryje and Drahlov are administrative parts of Charváty.

References

Villages in Olomouc District